W Andromedae is a variable star in the constellation of Andromeda. It is classified as a Mira variable and S-type star, and varies from an apparent visual magnitude of 14.6 at minimum brightness to a magnitude of 6.7 at maximum brightness, with a period of approximately 397.3 days. The star is losing mass due to stellar winds at a rate of 2.79 /yr.

References

Mira variables
Andromeda (constellation)
M-type giants
Andromedae, W
Durchmusterung objects
014028
010687
0663
S-type stars
Emission-line stars